The Peugeot Tennis Cup is a tennis tournament held in Rio de Janeiro, Brazil in 2012 and 2013. The event is part of the ATP Challenger Tour and is played on clay courts.

Past finals

Singles

Doubles

References

External links
Official website

 
ATP Challenger Tour
Clay court tennis tournaments
Tennis tournaments in Brazil